Plicaturopsis is a genus of fungi in the family Amylocorticiaceae. The genus was circumscribed by English mycologist Derek Reid in 1964.

References

External links

Amylocorticiales
Basidiomycota genera
Taxa named by Derek Reid
Taxa described in 1964